Apomecynini is a tribe of longhorn beetles of the subfamily Lamiinae.

Taxonomy

 Acanthosybra Breuning, 1939
 Acestrilla Bates, 1885
 Acrepidopterum Fisher, 1926
 Adetaptera Santos-Silva, Nascimento & Wappes, 2019
 Adetus LeConte, 1852
 Aethiopia Aurivillius, 1911
 Aletretiopsis Breuning, 1940
 Alluaudia Lameere, 1893
 Amblesthidopsis Aurivillius, 1921
 Ametacyna Hüdepohl, 1995
 Amphicnaeia Bates, 1866
 Ancornallis Fisher, 1935
 Anxylotoles Fisher, 1935
 Apomecyna Latreille, 1829
 Apomecynoides Breuning, 1950
 Apterapomecyna Breuning, 1970
 Asaperda Bates, 1873
 Assinia Lameere, 1893
 Asyngenes Bates, 1880
 Atelais Pascoe, 1867
 Athylia Pascoe, 1864
 Atimura Pascoe, 1863
 Atrichocera Aurivillius, 1911
 Auxa Pascoe, 1860
 Baudona Breuning, 1963
 Bebelis Thomson, 1864
 Bisaltes Thomson, 1868
 Bityle Pascoe, 1865
 Brachyelosoma Breuning, 1958
 Brachysybra Breuning
 Bybe Pascoe, 1866
 Bybeana Hüdepohl, 1996
 Callomecyna Tippmann, 1965
 Catuaba Martins & Galileo, 2003
 Cauca Lane, 1970
 Ceylanosybra Breuning, 1975
 Clavisybra Breuning, 1943
 Coomanum Pic, 1927
 Cornallis Thomson, 1864
 Craspedoderus Thomson, 1864
 Cristepilysta Breuning, 1951
 Cristoopsis Dillon & Dillon, 1952
 Cylindrosybra Aurivillius, 1922
 Cyrtinoopsis Dillon & Dillon, 1952
 Diamecyna Breuning, 1939
 Diasybra Breuning, 1959
 Diaxenes C. Waterhouse, 1884
 Discolops Fairmaire, 1886
 Dolichoropica Breuning, 1970
 Dolichosybra Breuning, 1942
 Doliops Waterhouse, 1841
 Dorcasta Pascoe, 1858
 Dyemus Pascoe, 1864
 Dymascus Pascoe, 1865
 Ebaeides Pascoe, 1864
 Elaidius Breuning, 1942
 Elongatosybra Breuning, 1961
 Enaretta Thomson, 1864
 Enispiella Breuning, 1938
 Eosybra Breuning, 1942
 Epaphra Newman, 1842
 Epilysta Pascoe, 1865
 Epilystoides Breuning, 1939
 Eremon Thomson, 1864
 Eremophanes Kolbe, 1894
 Eremophanoides Breuning, 1978
 Eremosybra Breuning, 1942
 Estigmenida Gahan, 1895
 Euryplocia Breuning, 1939
 Euryzeargyrea Breuning, 1957
 Euteleuta Bates, 1885
 Eyiaba Galileo & Martins, 2004
 Falsepilysta Breuning, 1939
 Falsischnolea Breuning, 1940
 Falsomoechotypa Breuning, 1954
 Falsomoechotypoides Breuning, 1959
 Falsoparmena Breuning, 1943
 Falsoropica Breuning, 1939
 Falsoropicoides Breuning, 1965
 Falsozorispiella Breuning, 1963
 Gemylus Pascoe, 1865
 Hestimidius Breuning, 1939
 Hestimoides Breuning, 1939
 Hippaphesis Thomson, 1864
 Hispomorpha Newman, 1842
 Hyagnis Pascoe, 1864
 Ichthyodes Newman, 1842
 Iproca Gressitt, 1940

 Irundialba Martins & Galileo, 2008
 Ischioloncha Thomson, 1860
 Kuatunia Gressitt, 1951
 Lagriadoliops Barševskis, 2014
 Lamprobityle Heller, 1923
 Laosepilysta Breuning, 1965
 Leptophaula Breuning, 1940
 Metamecyna Breuning, 1939
 Metamecynopsis Hüdepohl, 1995
 Metepilysta Breuning, 1970
 Meximia Pascoe, 1865
 Microlera Bates, 1873
 Microleroides Breuning, 1956
 Microloa Aurivillius, 1924
 Microplocia Heller, 1924
 Mimaelara Breuning, 1959
 Mimamblesthidus Breuning, 1961
 Mimassinia Breuning, 1965
 Mimatimura Breuning, 1939
 Mimatybe Breuning, 1957
 Mimecyroschema Breuning, 1969
 Mimepilysta Breuning, 1959
 Mimobybe Breuning, 1970
 Mimodiaxenes Breuning, 1939
 Mimofalsoropica Breuning, 1975
 Mimohyagnis Breuning, 1940
 Mimononyma Breuning, 1960
 Mimononymoides Breuning & Villiers, 1972
 Mimoopsis Breuning, 1942
 Mimophaeopate Breuning, 1967
 Mimopothyne Breuning, 1956
 Mimoropica Breuning & de Jong, 1941
 Mimosybra Breuning, 1939
 Mimotetrorea Breuning, 1973
 Mimoxenoleoides Breuning, 1963
 Mycerinopsis Thomson, 1864
 Mynonoma Pascoe, 1865
 Neosybra Breuning, 1939
 Nicomioides Breuning, 1939
 Niphoropica Breuning, 1947
 Niphosaperda Breuning, 1962
 Novorondonia Özdikmen, 2008
 Ogmodera Aurivillius, 1908
 Ogmoderidius Breuning, 1939
 Oopsidius Breuning, 1939
 Oopsis Fairmaire, 1850
 Orcesis Pascoe, 1866
 Orinoeme Pascoe, 1867
 Osckayia Perez-Flores & Santos-Silva, 2021
 Palausybra Gressitt, 1956
 Palpicrassus Galileo & Martins, 2007
 Parabybe Schwarzer, 1930
 Paracanthosybra Breuning, 1980
 Paracornallis Breuning, 1969
 Paradoliops Breuning, 1959
 Paradyemus Breuning, 1951
 Paraesylacris Breuning, 1940
 Parahathlia Breuning, 1961
 Parahyagnis Breuning, 1970
 Paramblesthidopsis Breuning, 1981
 Paramecyna Aurivillius, 1910
 Paranicomia Breuning, 1964
 Parapomecyna Breuning, 1968
 Parastathmodera Breuning, 1981
 Parasybrodiboma Breuning, 1969
 Paratheresina Breuning, 1975
 Parathylia Breuning, 1958
 Parauxa Breuning, 1940
 Parazorilispe Breuning, 1940
 Parepilysta Breuning, 1939
 Pareunidia Breuning, 1967
 Parichthyodes Breuning, 1959
 Pariproca Breuning, 1968
 Pemptolasius Gahan, 1890
 Phaeopate Pascoe, 1865
 Philomecyna Kolbe, 1894
 Phrynidius Lacordaire, 1869
 Pithodia Pascoe, 1865
 Plocia Newman, 1842
 Plociella Breuning, 1949
 Poromecyna Aurivillius, 1911
 Potiatuca Galileo & Martins, 2006
 Praonethomimus Breuning, 1939
 Prosenella Lane, 1959
 Pseudaelara Heller, 1912
 Pseudapomecyna Breuning, 1954
 Pseudepectasis Breuning, 1940
 Pseudepilysta Hüdepohl, 1996
 Pseudodoliops Vives, 2012
 Pseudokamikiria Breuning, 1964
 Pseudoopsis Breuning, 1956
 Pseudoropica Breuning, 1968
 Pseudorucentra Breuning, 1948
 Pseudostenidea Breuning, 1953
 Pseudosybra Breuning, 1960
 Pseudosybroides Breuning, 1979
 Pseudozorilispe Breuning, 1976
 Psudorucentra Breuning
 Ptericoptus Lepeletier & Audinet-Serville in Lacordaire, 1830
 Pulchrodiboma Breuning, 1947
 Ramularius Aurivillius, 1908
 Rhadia Pascoe, 1867
 Ropica Pascoe, 1858
 Ropicapomecyna Breuning, 1958
 Ropicella Breuning, 1940
 Ropicomimus Breuning, 1939
 Ropicosybra Pic, 1945
 Rosalba Thomson, 1864
 Rucentra Schwarzer, 1931
 Sarillus Bates, 1885
 Schoutedenius Breuning, 1954
 Setoropica Breuning, 1965
 Skillmania Santos-Silva, Nascimento & Wappes, 2019
 Somatolita Aurivillius, 1914
 Souvanna Breuning, 1963
 Spineuteleuta Breuning, 1961
 Stathmodera Gahan, 1890
 Stenocoptoides Breuning, 1942
 Stenocoptus Kolbe, 1894
 Stenopausa Breuning, 1940
 Subinermexocentrus Breuning, 1972
 Sybra Pascoe, 1865
 Sybrohyagnis Breuning, 1960
 Sybromimus Breuning, 1940
 Sybroopsis Breuning, 1949
 Symperga Lacordaire, 1872
 Sympergoides Lane, 1970
 Taiwanajinga Hayashi, 1978
 Tethystola Thomson, 1868
 Tetrarpages Thomson, 1868
 Theresina Breuning, 1963
 Trichatelais Breuning, 1953
 Tricheunidia Breuning, 1940
 Trichohestima Breuning, 1943
 Trichomecyna Breuning, 1939
 Trichoparmenonta Breuning, 1943
 Tuberculosybra Breuning, 1948
 Tucumaniella Breuning, 1943
 Tyloxoles Kriesche, 1927
 Typophaula Thomson, 1868
 Undulatodoliops Breuning, 1968
 Vandenbergheius Heffern, Santos-Silva & Botero, 2019
 Vitalisia Pic, 1924
 Xylariopsis Bates, 1884
 Xylosybra Breuning, 1939
 Ypomacena Martins, Galileo & Santos-Silva, 2016
 Zeargyrodes Fisher, 1925
 Zorilispe Pascoe, 1865
 Zorilispiella Breuning, 1959
 Zotale Pascoe, 1866

References

 
Lamiinae
Polyphaga tribes